On 26 March 1979, an Ilyuishin-18 crashed during takeoff from Quatro de Fevereiro Airport in Luanda, Angola, killing all ten people on board.

Background 
When Angola gained independence in 1975, power was in the hands of the People's Movement for the Liberation of Angola (MLPA), which was supported by the Soviet Union and the Eastern Bloc. The Zimbabwe African People's Union (ZAPU), which fought for the abolition of apartheid in Southern Rhodesia, also enjoyed the support of communist countries. For the planned ZAPU offensive, heavy weapons were delivered to the port of Luanda from East Germany by sea, which were planned to be further transported by air to Lusaka, Zambia, which bordered Southern Rhodesia (their government also supported ZAPU). As TAAG Angola Airlines could not transport these deliveries, an Il-18 cargo aircraft from Interflug was chartered instead, which was supposed to carry a total of 500 tons of weapons. Because the transportation of such cargo was prohibited by international agreements, the operation was carried out in secrecy. The plane arrived in Luanda, where the crew and technical staff were supposed to stay until the mission was completed.

Aircraft and crew 
The aircraft was an Ilyushin Il-18D (registered as DM-STL) that was built and delivered to Interflug in 1966 as a passenger aircraft. In 1974, it was converted into a freighter.

The crew consisted of captain Dieter Hartmann (44), first officer Jochen Wilsdorf (29), navigator Horst Umlauft (45), and flight engineer Frank-Rolf John (35).

Accident 
The aircraft took off with a take-off weight of 60.5 tons. 56 seconds into the takeoff roll, engine #2 failed. The takeoff was rejected, but there was insufficient runway remaining. The aircraft overran the end of the runway at high speed, collided with the instrument landing system antennas and burst into flames. All 10 people on board were killed.

Investigation 
The investigation was carried out by the airline lead by Interflug's CEO, Klaus Henckes. Captain Hartmann attempted to rotate the aircraft despite the failure, but then rejected the takeoff, presumably concerned that the engines would not provide enough thrust.

Aftermath 

Due to the classified nature of the cargo, Angola's report to ICAO stated that the aircraft was carrying humanitarian aid.

The Socialist Unity Party of Germany decided to continue the cargo transfer operation and sent another Ilyushin Il-18 (registration DM-STP) on 2 April 1979.

References 

Aviation accidents and incidents in Angola
Airliner accidents and incidents involving runway overruns
Interflug accidents and incidents
Aviation accidents and incidents in 1979
Accidents and incidents involving the Ilyushin Il-18
1979 in Angola
March 1979 events in Africa
Airliner accidents and incidents caused by engine failure
Airliner accidents and incidents caused by pilot error
March 1979 events